The women's football tournament at the 1998 Asian Games was held from 7 to 17 December 1998 in Thailand.

Venues

Squads

Results
All times are Indochina Time (UTC+07:00)

Preliminary round

Group A

Group B

Knockout round

Semifinals

Bronze medal match

Gold medal match

Goalscorers

Final standing

References

RSSSF

External links
Results

Women